Professor Ranjan Ramasamy is a Sri Lankan born Australian academic and scientist. He was formerly a Professor of Immunology and Biochemistry, and the Chairman of the National Science Foundation of Sri Lanka.

Educated at the Royal College, Colombo, Sri Lanka and at The Perse School, Cambridge, England, he went on to gain a BA in Natural Sciences (1971) and a PhD (1974) from University of Cambridge, Cambridge, England.

References

2. Ranjan Ramasamy (0000-0003-0246-7053) - ORCID | Connecting Research and Researchers

3. https://www.researchgate.net/profile/Ranjan-Ramasamy

Living people
Alumni of Royal College, Colombo
People educated at The Perse School
Alumni of Christ's College, Cambridge
Sri Lankan Tamil biochemists
Sri Lankan Tamil academics
Sri Lankan emigrants to Australia
Year of birth missing (living people)